The 1982–83 FIS Ski Jumping World Cup was the fourth World Cup season in ski jumping. It began in Cortina d'Ampezzo, Italy on 18 December 1982 and finished in Planica, Yugoslavia on 27 March 1983. The individual World Cup was won by Matti Nykänen and Nations Cup by Norway.

Map of world cup hosts 
All 17 locations which have been hosting world cup events for men this season.

 Four Hills Tournament
 Swiss Tournament
 Bohemia Tournament
 KOP International Ski Flying Week

Calendar

Men

Standings

Overall

Nations Cup

Four Hills Tournament

References 

World cup
World cup
FIS Ski Jumping World Cup